Lieutenant General Sir Edward Dacre Howard-Vyse KBE CB MC (27 November 1905 – 26 December 1992) was a senior British Army officer as well as a British horse rider who competed in the 1936 Summer Olympics.

He was the younger son of Colonel Cecil Howard-Vyse of Langton Hall, Malton, North Yorkshire.

Career
Edward Howard-Vyse was commissioned into the Royal Artillery in 1927.

In 1936 he and his horse Blue Steel won the bronze medal as part of the British eventing team, after finishing 19th in the individual eventing competition.

He served in World War II and was promoted to Major in 1942.

After the War he took office as Director Royal Artillery from 1959 to 1961 and then General Officer Commanding-in-Chief of Western Command from 1961 to 1964. He retired in 1964.

He was also Colonel Commandant of the Royal Artillery from 1962 until 1970.

Family
In 1940 he married Mary Bridget Willoughby and together they went on to have two sons and a daughter.

He died in Ryedale in 1992.

References

 

1905 births
1992 deaths
Military personnel from Edinburgh
Burials in North Yorkshire
British event riders
Olympic equestrians of Great Britain
British male equestrians
Equestrians at the 1936 Summer Olympics
Olympic bronze medallists for Great Britain
Knights Commander of the Order of the British Empire
Companions of the Order of the Bath
Recipients of the Military Cross
British Army lieutenant generals
British Army personnel of World War II
Royal Artillery officers
Olympic medalists in equestrian
Medalists at the 1936 Summer Olympics